The 2014–15 QMJHL season is the 46th season of the Quebec Major Junior Hockey League (QMJHL). The regular season consisted of eighteen teams playing 68 games each, beginning on September 10, 2014, and ending on March 22, 2015.

Regular season standings

Note: GP = Games played; W = Wins; L = Losses; OTL = Overtime losses; SL = Shootout losses; GF = Goals for; GA = Goals against; PTS = Points; x = clinched playoff berth; y = clinched division title

Note: Tiebreaker for 6th, 7th and 8th based on regulation and overtime wins only. Val-d'Or had 31, Baie-Comeau had 30, Sherbrooke had 29.

Scoring leaders
Note: GP = Games played; G = Goals; A = Assists; Pts = Points; PIM = Penalty minutes

Leading goaltenders
Note: GP = Games played; Mins = Minutes played; W = Wins; L = Losses: OTL = Overtime losses; SL = Shootout losses; GA = Goals Allowed; SO = Shutouts; GAA = Goals against average

2015 President's Cup playoffs

First round

(1) Rimouski Océanic vs. (16) Victoriaville Tigres

(2) Moncton Wildcats vs. (15) Chicoutimi Saguenéens

(3) Blainville-Boisbriand Armada vs. (14) Gatineau Olympiques

(4) Quebec Remparts vs. (13) Cape Breton Screaming Eagles

(5) Shawinigan Cataractes vs. (12) Halifax Mooseheads

(6) Val-d'Or Foreurs vs. (11) Rouyn-Noranda Huskies

(7) Baie-Comeau Drakkar vs. (10) Saint John Sea Dogs

(8) Sherbrooke Phoenix vs. (9) Charlottetown Islanders

Quarter-finals

(1) Rimouski Océanic vs. (14) Gatineau Olympiques

(2) Moncton Wildcats vs. (12) Halifax Mooseheads

(4) Quebec Remparts vs. (9) Charlottetown Islanders

(6) Val-d'Or Foreurs vs. (7) Baie-Comeau Drakkar

Semi-finals

(1) Rimouski Océanic vs. (6) Val-d'Or Foreurs

(2) Moncton Wildcats vs. (4) Quebec Remparts

President's Cup Finals

(1) Rimouski Océanic vs. (4) Quebec Remparts

Playoff scoring leaders
Note: GP = Games played; G = Goals; A = Assists; Pts = Points; PIM = Penalty minutes

Playoff leading goaltenders

Note: GP = Games played; Mins = Minutes played; W = Wins; L = Losses: OTL = Overtime losses; SL = Shootout losses; GA = Goals Allowed; SO = Shutouts; GAA = Goals against average

Memorial Cup

Trophies and awards
President's Cup - Playoff Champions: Rimouski Océanic
Jean Rougeau Trophy - Regular Season Champions: Rimouski Océanic
Luc Robitaille Trophy - Team with the best goals for average: Moncton Wildcats
Robert Lebel Trophy - Team with best GAA: Blainville-Boisbriand Armada

Player
Michel Brière Memorial Trophy - Most Valuable Player: Conor Garland, Moncton Wildcats
Jean Béliveau Trophy - Top Scorer: Conor Garland, Moncton Wildcats
Guy Lafleur Trophy - Playoff MVP: Adam Erne, Quebec Remparts
Jacques Plante Memorial Trophy - Top Goaltender: Philippe Desrosiers, Rimouski Océanic
Guy Carbonneau Trophy - Best Defensive Forward: Frédérik Gauthier, Rimouski Océanic
Emile Bouchard Trophy - Defenceman of the Year: Jan Košťálek, Rimouski Océanic
Kevin Lowe Trophy - Best Defensive Defenceman: Jan Košťálek, Rimouski Oceanic
Michael Bossy Trophy - Top Prospect: Timo Meier, Halifax Mooseheads
RDS Cup - Rookie of the Year: Dmytro Timashov, Quebec Remparts
Michel Bergeron Trophy - Offensive Rookie of the Year: Dmytro Timashov, Quebec Remparts
Raymond Lagacé Trophy - Defensive Rookie of the Year: Samuel Girard, Shawinigan Cataractes
Frank J. Selke Memorial Trophy - Most sportsmanlike player: Kyle Farrell, Cape Breton Screaming Eagles
QMJHL Humanitarian of the Year - Humanitarian of the Year: Danick Martel, Blainville-Boisbriand Armada
Marcel Robert Trophy - Best Scholastic Player: Jérémy Grégoire, Baie-Comeau Drakkar
Paul Dumont Trophy - Personality of the Year: Nikolaj Ehlers, Halifax Mooseheads

Executive
Ron Lapointe Trophy - Coach of the Year: Joël Bouchard, Blainville-Boisbriand Armada
Maurice Filion Trophy - General Manager of the Year: Martin Moudou, Shawinigan Cataractes
John Horman Trophy - Executive of the Year: 
Jean Sawyer Trophy - Marketing Director of the Year:

All-Star Teams 
First All-Star Team:
 Marvin Cupper, Goaltender, Shawinigan Cataractes
 Jan Košťálek, Defenceman, Rimouski Océanic
 Daniel Walcott, Defenceman, Blainville-Boisbriand Armada
 Danick Martel, Centre, Blainville-Boisbriand Armada
 Nikolaj Ehlers, Left Wing, Halifax Mooseheads
 Conor Garland, Right Wing, Moncton Wildcats

Second All-Star Team:
 Philippe Cadorette, Goaltender, Baie-Comeau Drakkar
 Nikolas Brouillard, Defenceman, Quebec Remparts
 Alexandre Carrier, Defenceman, Gatineau Olympiques
 Anthony Beauvillier, Centre, Shawinigan Cataractes
 Nikita Jevpalovs, Left Wing, Blainville-Boisbriand Armada
 Timo Meier, Right Wing, Halifax Mooseheads

All-Rookie Team:
 Evan Fitzpatrick, Goaltender, Sherbrooke Phoenix
 Samuel Girard, Defenceman, Shawinigan Cataractes
 Jakub Zbořil, Defenceman, Saint John Sea Dogs
 Filip Chlapík, Centre, Charlottetown Islanders
 Dmytro Timashov, Left Wing, Quebec Remparts
 Evgeny Svechnikov, Right Wing, Cape Breton Screaming Eagles

See also
 List of QMJHL seasons
 2014 in ice hockey
 2014–15 OHL season
 2014–15 WHL season
 2015 in ice hockey
 2015 Memorial Cup

References

External links
 Official QMJHL website
 Official CHL website
 Official website of the Subway Super Series

Quebec Major Junior Hockey League seasons
Qmjhl